Just as I Am is the debut studio album by American gospel singer Yolanda Adams. It was released by the Sound of Gospel on September 22, 1987 in the United States. Production was helmed by Thomas Whitfield, who also worked with singer Vanessa Bell Armstrong on early 1980s gospel releases. Though original pressings of the vinyl and cassette release are difficult to find, the album has since been re-released on CD along with another catalog album from Sound of Gospel by Wanda Nero Butler entitled New Born Soul.

Track listing

Personnel 
Produced by Thomas Whitfield and Lanar Brantley
Executive Producer: Armen Boladian
Thomas Whitfield — keyboards, Baldwin & Yamaha pianos; string and synthesizer arrangements and overdubs; all vocal and instrumental arrangements
Earl J. Wright — synthesizer overdubs; string arrangements programming
Lanar Brantley — bass guitar; instrumental arrangements; exclusive drum programming and arrangements
Jonathan DuBose — lead & rhythm guitars; bass section on "Deliverance"
Larry Fratangelo — percussions exclusively
Raphael Merriweather Jr. — percussion overdubs
Walter L. Stevenson Jr. — vocal overdubs and tambourine on "Deliverance" (see YouTube page for artist's artistic portfolio)
Singers — Sandy Hudson, Michael Fletcher, Doretha Carter, Renee Thomas, Larry D. Edwards, Juliette Cooper, Gwen Morton, Ron Kelley, Valerie Hancox, Larry McMurtry, Thomas Whitfield

Charts

References

External links 
 

1987 debut albums
Yolanda Adams albums